The 2008 IIHF European Champions Cup was the fourth and the last edition of IIHF European Champions Cup. It was held in Saint Petersburg at the Ice Palace arena, from January 10 to January 13. The champions of 2007 of the six strongest hockey nations of Europe participate: Metallurg Magnitogorsk (RUS), Modo Hockey (SWE), HC Slovan Bratislava (SVK), Kärpät (FIN), HC Sparta Prague (CZE), HC Davos (SUI).

Metallurg won its first European Champions Cup, and third European club championship following European Hockey League titles in 1999 and 2000.

Group A
Ivan Hlinka Division

Standings

Results
All times local (CET/UTC +1)

Group B
 Alexander Ragulin Division

Standings

Results
All times local (CET/UTC +1)

Gold medal game
Metallurg Magnitogorsk qualified for the final of the European Champions Cup thanks to a shootout win against Slovan Bratislava. The Slovaks were close to a surprise but the Russians could overcome the hard-working opponent at the end of the game. Metallurg played HC Sparta Prague in Sunday’s gold medal game.

External links
 Official site

1
1
IIHF European Champions Cup
International ice hockey competitions hosted by Russia